MASTER (Mobile Astronomical System of Telescope-Robots) is a Russian network of automated telescopes in five Russian cities, and in South Africa, Argentina and the Canary Islands. It is intended to react quickly to reports of transient astronomical events. It started its development in 2002 and it is in fully autonomous operations since 2011.

On 17 August 2017, an autonomous MASTER telescope in Argentina successfully recorded a collision of neutron stars some 130 million light-years away.

See also
 List of astronomical observatories
 List of astronomical societies
 Lists of telescopes

Notes

External links
 Official website

Astronomical observatories in Russia
Astronomical observatories in South Africa
Astronomical observatories in Argentina
Astronomical observatories in the Canary Islands